Thallarcha jocularis is a moth of the subfamily Arctiinae first described by Rudolph Rosenstock in 1885. It is found in the Australian states of New South Wales and Victoria.

References

External links
Australian Faunal Directory

Moths of Australia
Lithosiini
Moths described in 1885